Heldner is a surname. Notable people with the surname include:

 Collette Pope Heldner (1902–1990), American painter
 Fabian Heldner (born 1996), Swiss ice hockey player
 Knute Heldner (1875–1952), Swedish-American artist

See also
 Hélder